Dovonte Edwards (born October 17, 1982) is a former gridiron football cornerback. He was signed by the Minnesota Vikings as an undrafted free agent in 2005. He played college football at North Carolina State.

Edwards was also a member of the New York Giants, Detroit Lions and Toronto Argonauts. He later played for the Omaha Nighthawks of the United Football League.

He is currently the defensive coordinator at Elon and had previously been the defensive coordinator at Morehead State.

Early years
As a senior at Chapel Hill High School in Chapel Hill, North Carolina, Edwards had 14 receiving, 2 punt returns and 1 kickoff returns for touchdowns in football. He was also a 3-time all-conference selection in basketball.

College career
Edwards was a four-year player at NC State, where he played Cornerback, Wide Receiver and returned punts. He was named Most Outstanding Defensive Player after the 2004 season. He started all 11 games at cornerback as a senior and led the team with 3 interceptions. He also played basketball as a freshman and sophomore.

Professional career

2005
Edwards first national exposure came on Monday Night Football when he intercepted a Brett Favre pass and returned it 51 yards for a touchdown. Edwards was a possible reason the Vikings were able to release Ken Irvin and sign a third quarterback, J. T. O'Sullivan, when Daunte Culpepper was lost for the season.

2006
Edwards' second NFL season ended prematurely after suffering a season-ending arm injury against Dallas in the preseason while battling with rookie Cedric Griffin for the nickleback spot.

2007
Edwards looked to make a comeback in 2007 and battle for the nickel and dime spot on the team along with Charles Gordon and Ronyell Whittaker. However, he appeared to be the odd man out, as he was cut during the finals roster cuts and claimed by Giants on the same day. However, he was released by Giants just six days later. Edwards was signed by the Lions to the active roster on October 17. Was inactive vs. the Tampa Bay Buccaneers, at the Chicago Bears and vs. the Denver Broncos. Made two special teams tackles at Arizona in his first action since signing with the Lions. Was inactive vs. the New York Giants, against the Packers and at Minnesota. Edwards recorded a career-high in tackles with 10 against the Dallas Cowboys. Had three tackles and a pass defensed at the San Diego Chargers. Made one tackle and two passes defensed against the Kansas City Chiefs, also had two special teams tackles. Had three tackles (two solo) to finish the season at Green Bay.

2008
Edwards was released by the Detroit Lions during the 2008 preseason and spent the rest of the year out of football.

2009
Edwards was signed by the Toronto Argonauts on May 12, 2009. During the 2009 CFL season, Edwards served as the Argonauts' primary kick returner.

2010
Due to a leg injury, Edwards was unable to play football for the upcoming season. He was released by the Argonauts on June 1, 2010.

2011
On May 27, 2011, Edwards re-signed with the Toronto Argonauts. He was released by the Argonauts on June 24, 2011.

Professional career stats

References

External links
 Elon profile
 Just Sports Stats

1982 births
Living people
American football cornerbacks
Canadian football defensive backs
Detroit Lions players
Elon Phoenix football coaches
Furman Paladins football coaches
Minnesota Vikings players
Morehead State Eagles football coaches
Kentucky Christian Knights football coaches
NC State Wolfpack football players
New York Giants players
North Carolina Central Eagles football coaches
Omaha Nighthawks players
Toronto Argonauts players
Chapel Hill High School (Chapel Hill, North Carolina) alumni
People from Chapel Hill, North Carolina
Coaches of American football from North Carolina
Players of American football from North Carolina
African-American coaches of American football
African-American players of American football
African-American players of Canadian football
21st-century African-American sportspeople